Mustapha Choukri also spelled Mustafa Choukri nicknamed Pitchou (1945 – 22 January 1980) is a Moroccan football midfielder who played for Morocco in the 1970 FIFA World Cup. He also played for Raja CA Casablanca.

References

1945 births
1980 deaths
Moroccan footballers
Moroccan expatriate footballers
Morocco international footballers
Association football midfielders
Raja CA players
Al-Wehda Club (Mecca) players
Botola players
Saudi Professional League players
1970 FIFA World Cup players
1972 African Cup of Nations players
Footballers from Casablanca
Expatriate footballers in Saudi Arabia
Moroccan expatriate sportspeople in Saudi Arabia